Arambala is a municipality (municipio) in the Morazán Department of El Salvador.  As of 2003, it had a population of 2116.

Municipalities of the Morazán Department